Hungama Bombay Ishtyle is a 1978 Indian Hindi-language black and white film directed by Siraj Ayesha Sayani who co-produced it with Pearl Padamsee. It stars Amrish Puri and Naseeruddin Shah; relatively unknown actors who later on became well known in the Indian entertainment industry. Padamsee herself played the antagonist with Keith Stevenson. The film has reportedly been digitally remastered.

Plot 
Mani, daughter of a rich businessman, becomes friends with street children and goes around town having fun with them. Family of Mani is trying to locate her through constable Sakharam who in turn relies on his dog Tiger. Meantime villain Aunty and her sidekick Bundledas plan to kidnap Mani, which is overheard by Jaggu. The street children all the time keep hiding Mani and protect her.

Cast 

 Mohan Agashe
 Pearl Padamsee
 Amrish Puri
 Naseeruddin Shah
 Dilip Chandiwalo
 Mohan Gokhale
 Keith Stevenson

References

External links 

 

1978 films
1970s children's comedy films
1970s Hindi-language films
Indian children's films
Indian black-and-white films
1978 comedy films